Canas de Santa Maria is a town and a freguesia in the Tondela municipality, Viseu District, Portugal. The population in 2011 was 1,806, in an area of 13.85 km2. The freguesia contains the small village Valverde.

References

Towns in Portugal
Freguesias of Tondela
Populated places in Viseu District